Avni Kurgan (born 17 June 1912, date of death unknown) was a Turkish footballer. He played in one match for the Turkey national football team in 1931. He was also part of Turkey's squad for the football tournament at the 1936 Summer Olympics, but he did not play in any matches.

References

External links
 

1912 births
Year of death missing
Turkish footballers
Turkey international footballers
Place of birth missing
Association football goalkeepers
Galatasaray S.K. footballers